"More Than a Woman" is a song by musical group the Bee Gees, written by Barry, Robin, and Maurice Gibb for the soundtrack to the film Saturday Night Fever. It became a regular feature of the group's live sets from 1977 until Maurice Gibb's death in 2003 and was often coupled with "Night Fever".

Recording and release
The Bee Gees started to record the song from February to March 1977 in the Château d'Hérouville, Hérouville in France, continued it in Criteria Studios in Miami in April, and later in September, the song was finished in Cherokee Studios, Los Angeles.

The soundtrack includes two versions — one by the Bee Gees and the other by Tavares. Both versions are featured in the film as well. The song has been recorded and performed by various artists but in different forms. The song by the Bee Gees was not released as a single in the US and the UK, but only in some other territories like Italy and Australia. Despite that, it has remained a staple on radio, and is one of their best known songs. An abridged live version of the song, performed by the Bee Gees in 1997, is available on both the DVD and CD versions of One Night Only.

The song has also been included on Bee Gees compilations such as Tales from the Brothers Gibb and Their Greatest Hits: The Record. The very first British pressings of Their Greatest Hits: The Record featured the song with a mastering fault, with the audio noticeably dipping to the right briefly during the first verse. This was corrected after several thousand copies had been distributed.

A new remix of the song was done by British DJ SG Lewis, which was released in 2021 in response to the TikTok craze.

Personnel
Credits adapted from the album Saturday Night Fever: The Original Movie Sound Track.
Barry Gibb – vocals, guitar
Robin Gibb – vocals
Maurice Gibb – vocals, bass guitar
Alan Kendall – guitar
Dennis Bryon – drums
Blue Weaver – keyboards
Joe Lala – percussion

Charts

Weekly charts

Year-end charts

Certifications

Tavares version

"More Than a Woman" was also recorded by Tavares in 1977, and also appeared in Saturday Night Fever and on the soundtrack album. It also featured on their 1978 album Future Bound. Their version charted at number 32 on the US Billboard Hot 100 and number 7 on the UK Singles Chart.

Charts

Weekly charts

Year-end charts

911 version

In 1998, British boy band 911 recorded "More Than a Woman" for their third studio album, There It Is (1999). Produced by Phil Harding and Ian Curnow, this version was released on 12 October 1998 as the album's lead single and peaked at number two on the UK Singles Chart while also charting in France and New Zealand.

Release and reception
911's version of "More Than a Woman" was added to BBC Radio 1's As Featured playlist on 7 September 1998; by the end of the month, it had been upgraded to the station's A-list. On 12 October 1998, Virgin Records released the song in the United Kingdom as two CD singles and a cassette single. Six days later, the song debuted and peaked at number two on the UK Singles Chart, becoming the band's highest-charting single in the UK until the follow up, a cover of Dr. Hook's "A Little Bit More", topped the UK chart in January 1999. For most of the week, "More Than a Woman" outsold Spacedust's "Gym and Tonic", but the latter song slipped ahead to become the number-one song of that week despite mediocre sales. "More Than a Woman" spent four weeks in the top 40 and 15 weeks in the top 100.

On the Eurochart Hot 100, the cover reached number 18 on 31 October 1998 as that week's Sales Breaker. Elsewhere in Europe, the song charted in France in March 1999, when it appeared on the SNEP Singles Chart for a single week at number 94, becoming the band's only single to chart there. In New Zealand, the song became 911's third of four songs to reach the top 50 on the New Zealand Singles Chart. After debuting at number 20 on 14 March 1999, it rose to its peak of number eight the following week to become the band's highest-charting song in New Zealand. It spent a further seven nonconsecutive weeks in the top 50.

Track listings

UK CD1
"More Than a Woman" (radio edit) – 3:11
"Nothing Stops the Rain" – 3:34
"Forever in My Heart" – 4:02
"Interactive element

UK CD2
"More Than a Woman" (radio edit) – 3:11
"Nothing Stops the Rain" – 3:34
"More Than a Woman" (Dave Lee's 54 Mix) – 7:59

UK cassette single
"More Than a Woman" (radio edit) – 3:11
"Nothing Stops the Rain" – 3:34
"More Than a Woman" (Dave Lee's Rare Mix) – 6:37

European CD single
"More Than a Woman" (radio edit) – 3:11
"Nothing Stops the Rain" – 3:34

Personnel
Personnel are adapted from the UK CD1 liner notes.

Barry Gibb – writing
Robin Gibb – writing
Maurice Gibb – writing
Tony Remy – guitar
Henry Thomas – bass
Mikeal J. Parlet – flute, saxophone
Michele Chiavarini – keys
Robert Anderson – percussion

Phil Harding – production
Ian Curnow – production
Dave Lee – additional production and mix
K-Boy Brooks – engineering
John O'Donnell – engineering
Joe @ Virgin Art – artwork design
Richard McLaren – photography

Charts

References

1977 singles
1977 songs
1998 singles
Bee Gees songs
Tavares (group) songs
911 (English group) songs
Capitol Records singles
Disco songs
EMI Records singles
Number-one singles in Scotland
Polydor Records singles
RSO Records singles
Song recordings produced by Barry Gibb
Song recordings produced by Robin Gibb
Song recordings produced by Maurice Gibb
Song recordings produced by Phil Harding (producer)
Songs from Saturday Night Fever
Songs written by Barry Gibb
Songs written by Maurice Gibb
Songs written by Robin Gibb
Virgin Records singles